Raja Swarup Singh (30 May 1812 – 26 January 1864; his name is alt. spelt as Sarup Singh) was a Sidhu Jat Raja of Jind State of the Phulkian dynasty who reigned from 1834 to 1864. He was noted for his bravery as a warrior.

Early life
Swarup Singh was born at Bazidpur, the only son of Sardar Karam Singh (d. 1818), who was himself a nephew to Raja Bagh Singh of Jind (1760-1819; r. 1789-1819) through his father, Rajkumar Bhup Singh (1771–1815). In his earlier years, Karam Singh had served under Maharaja Ranjit Singh. In 1815, Karam Singh was granted the fief of Bazidpur after Bhup Singh's death. Through his father, Swarup Singh was a first cousin once removed to Hira Singh of Nabha. Karam Singh died in 1818, and Swarup Singh succeeded his father as Sardar of Bazidpur.

Raja and warrior

In 1834, Swarup Singh's second cousin, Raja Sangat Singh (1810–1834; r. 1822–1834) died of alcoholism after a profligate and repressive 12-year rule that had brought Jind to the brink of financial collapse; he left no sons. The Government of India (then the British East India Company), selected Swarup Singh as the next ruler.

During the Anglo-Sikh War, Swarup Singh fought on the side of the British, for which he was much honoured by them. During the First War of Independence, he sent his troops into battle against the rebels, personally fighting through many of the major battles clad in armor and chain mail. He rushed his forces to defend the British cantonment at Karnal, then served at Alipur and at the Battle of Badli-ki-Serai. He fought alongside the British forces during the siege of Delhi for which he was mentioned in despatches in 1858 and received the Indian Mutiny Medal. Also in 1858, he received several titles of honour from the British government. In 1860, he was granted a further title, a gun salute of 11-guns, 14 villages and the Delhi properties of a Mughal prince, Shahzada Mirza Abu Baqar. The following year, Swarup Singh received a further 11 villages as a reward.

Not merely a warrior, but also a progressive and humane ruler, Swarup Singh issued several stern decrees outlawing infanticide, sati and slavery.

Last years and death
In 1863, Swarup Singh was appointed a Knight Companion of the Order of the Star of India. The following year, he unexpectedly died from acute dysentery after a 30-year reign, aged 51. He was succeeded by his only surviving son, Raghubir Singh.

Family
Swarup Singh married twice, first to an unknown princess (d. 1877) and secondly to Rani Sri Nand Kaur Sahiba. He had two sons:
1. Tikka Sri Randhir Singh Sahib Bahadur (d. 1848). No issue.
2. Sri Tikka Sahib Raghubir Singh, who succeeded his father as Raja of Jind.

Titles
1812-1818: Kunwar Sri Swarup Singh
1818-1834: Sardar Sri Swarup Singh
1834-1858: Raja Sri Swarup Singh, Raja of Jind
1858-1860: His Highness Farzand-i-Dilband, Rasikh-ul-Itiqad, Raja Sri Swarup Singh Bahadur, Raja of Jind
1860-1863: His Highness Farzand-i-Dilband, Rasikh-ul-Itiqad-i-Daulat-i-Inglishia, Raja Sri Swarup Singh Bahadur, Raja of Jind
1863-1864: His Highness Farzand-i-Dilband, Rasikh-ul-Itiqad-i-Daulat-i-Inglishia, Raja Sir Swarup Singh Bahadur, Raja of Jind, KSI

Honours
Mentioned in Despatches-1858
Indian Mutiny Medal-1858
Knight Companion of the Order of the Star of India (KSI)-1863

References

Indian Sikhs
19th-century Indian monarchs
Knights Companion of the Order of the Star of India
1812 births
1864 deaths
Jind
Indian knights